Hüseyin Öztoprak is the Agriculture and Forestry Minister  in the 20th Government of the Turkish Republic of Northern Cyprus under Prime Minister Ferdi Sabit Soyer.  He was confirmed in his office in April 2005.

References

Year of birth missing (living people)
Living people
Government ministers of Northern Cyprus
Place of birth missing (living people)